Francesco Pendasio (1571 – September 1616) was a Catholic prelate who served as Bishop of Alba (1605–1616).

Biography
Francesco Pendasio was born in Mantua, Italy in 1571. On 18 July 1605, he was appointed during the papacy of Pope Paul V as Bishop of Alba. On 10 August 1605, he was consecrated bishop by Girolamo Bernerio, Cardinal-Bishop of Albano. He served as Bishop of Alba until his death in September 1616.

References

External links and additional sources
 (for Chronology of Bishops) 
 (for Chronology of Bishops) 

17th-century Italian Roman Catholic bishops
Bishops appointed by Pope Paul V
1571 births
1616 deaths